Marlene Catterall (born March 1, 1939) is a former Canadian politician. Catterall was a member of the Liberal Party of Canada in the House of Commons of Canada, representing the riding of Ottawa West—Nepean from 1997 to 2005 and previously representing the riding of Ottawa West from 1988 to 1997.

Born in Ottawa, Ontario, Catterall is a former consultant and teacher. She is a former Deputy Government Whip and Chief Government Whip and a former Parliamentary Secretary to the President of the Treasury Board.  She ran for Mayor of Ottawa in 1985 but lost to Jim Durrell by over 20,000 votes. She was well involved in Ottawa politics serving as an alderman on Ottawa City Council from 1976 to 1985.

Catterall announced that she would not be a candidate in the 2006 federal election.  Following her retirement, the riding changed from Liberal to Conservative by a margin of around 5,000 votes.

External links
 
"How'd They Vote?":Marlene Catterall's voting history and quotes

1939 births
Living people
Members of the House of Commons of Canada from Ontario
Liberal Party of Canada MPs
Ottawa city councillors
Women members of the House of Commons of Canada
Women municipal councillors in Canada
Women in Ontario politics
21st-century Canadian politicians
21st-century Canadian women politicians